

Tahkuna Lighthouse (Estonian: Tahkuna tuletorn) is a lighthouse located in the Tahkuna Peninsula, Hiiu Parish, on the island of Hiiumaa, in Estonia.

History 
The construction of the lighthouse began in 1873. The lighthouse has a metal structure, designed by British Alexander Gordon. The prefabricated structure of the lighthouse was made in France in 1873, and constructed in 1875, in the current location. The lighthouse has a height of 42.6 metres, and is the tallest of this type structure in Estonia. Since its construction the lighthouse has remained unchanged.

See also 

 List of lighthouses in Estonia

References

External links 

 

Lighthouses completed in 1875
Resort architecture in Estonia
Lighthouses in Estonia
Hiiumaa Parish
Buildings and structures in Hiiu County
Tourist attractions in Hiiu County